Proline-rich protein 4 is a protein that in humans is encoded by the PRR4 gene.

Lacrimal proline rich protein is a member of the proline-rich protein family which lacks a conserved repetitive domain. It may have a role in protective functions in the eye.

References

Further reading